Evan Lloyd may refer to:
Evan Lloyd (poet) (c. 1734–1776), Welsh poet
Evan Lloyd (MP) (died 1587), MP for Denbighshire
Evan Lloyd (rugby union, born 1871) (1871–1951), Welsh international rugby union wing
Evan Lloyd (rugby union, born 2000), Welsh rugby union fly-half
Evan Lloyd Vaughan (c. 1709–1791), Welsh politician
Sir Evan Lloyd, 1st Baronet (c. 1622–1663) of the Lloyd baronets
Sir Evan Lloyd, 2nd Baronet (c. 1654–1700) of the Lloyd baronets